Several political groupings functioned in the Dominion of Newfoundland under the name Liberal Party of Newfoundland from the granting of responsible government to the island in the 1850s until its suspension in 1934 when the Commission of Government was instituted. During that period, Newfoundland was an independent dominion within the British Empire, responsible for its own internal affairs.

The original Liberal Party was originally a coalition of Catholics and Methodists who opposed the Anglican-dominated political establishment. This party agitated for the granting of 'responsible government' to the island. Shortly after responsible government was instituted in 1854, the Methodists left the party to join the Anglicans in the Conservative Party, leaving the Liberals as a predominantly Irish Catholic party. Political parties in the dominion were thus divided along sectarian lines for the next thirty years - a situation that resulted in periodic riots and other political violence. This division also reflected class differences: most Catholics were working class or farmers, and most members of the middle and business classes were Protestant.

In the 1880s, a denominational compromise was reached and political parties realigned with a new Liberal Party being formed by former Conservative Premier William Whiteway. Whiteway launched the new Liberal Party as a vehicle to promote the construction of a cross-island railway.

Under Robert Bond, the Liberals suffered a split when Edward Patrick Morris left to form the Newfoundland People's Party. The NPP won the 1909 and 1913 elections. In 1919, Richard Squires merged his Liberal Party with the Fishermen's Protective Union to form the Liberal Reform Party. The Liberal Reform Party won the 1919 election, but collapsed prior to the 1924 election due to a crisis over corruption. This crisis toppled both Squires and his successor, William Warren. In 1923, some members of the Liberal Reform Party joined with Albert Hickman and John Robert Bennett to form a new Liberal-Progressive Party.

Many former supporters of William Warren joined in alliance with former Conservative leader William J. Higgins to form the Liberal-Conservative Progressive Party. This party emerged as a conservative opposition to the Liberals and won the 1924 election. It later changed its name to the United Newfoundland Party.

By 1928, Squires had formed a new Liberal Party, which won the 1928 election. This second Squires government was again beset by corruption and scandal. The economic crisis caused by the Great Depression compounded these problems, and led to riots in 1932. Squires's government was toppled by the conservative United Newfoundland Party.

The UNP was elected on a promise to consider suspending responsible government. Responsible government was suspended in 1934, and a Commission of Government appointed by the British government took over the administration of Newfoundland. Newfoundland's status as an independent dominion came to an end, along with party politics.

Party politics returned to Newfoundland when it joined Canadian confederation in 1949 and a new Liberal Party of Newfoundland and Labrador was formed under the leadership of Joseph Smallwood. The pre-Commission of Government Liberals, both in their early incarnation and their relaunching under Whiteway, tended to be identified more with poorer Newfoundlanders, while the Conservatives tended to be the party of the business establishment.

Leaders
 Liberal Party of Newfoundland
 William Whiteway 1885-1897
 Robert Bond 1897-1914
 J.M. Kent 1914-1916
 W.F. Lloyd 1916-1919
 Liberal Reform Party
 Richard Squires 1919-1924
 William Warren 1924
 Albert Hickman 1924

Liberal-Progressive Party
 Albert Hickman 1924-1928

Liberal Party of Newfoundland
 Sir Richard Squires 1928-1932
 Frederick Gordon Bradley 1932-1934

See also
 Conservative parties in Newfoundland (pre-Confederation)
 List of Newfoundland Prime Ministers
 List of political parties in Newfoundland and Labrador
 General elections in Newfoundland (pre-Confederation)
 Liberal Party of Newfoundland and Labrador

Political parties in the Dominion of Newfoundland
Liberal Party of Newfoundland and Labrador